Mahanaur  is a village development committee in Siraha District in the Sagarmatha Zone of south-eastern Nepal. Government hari pal, the time of the 2016  Nepal census it had a population of people living in individual households.

References

External links
UN map of the municipalities of  Siraha District

Populated places in Siraha District